is a passenger railway station located in the city of Konan, Shiga Prefecture, Japan, operated by the West Japan Railway Company (JR West).

Lines

Station layout
The station consists of two opposed side platforms connected by a footbridge. The station is staffed.

Platforms

History
Ishibe Station opened on December 15, 1889 as a station on the Kansai Railway, which was nationalized in 1907 to become part of the Japanese Government Railway (JGR), and subsequently the Japan National Railway (JNR) . The station became part of the West Japan Railway Company on April 1, 1987 due to the privatization and dissolution of the JNR.

Passenger statistics
In fiscal 2019, the station was used by an average of 1871 passengers daily (boarding passengers only).

Surrounding area
 Yoshimiko Shrine -10 minutes on foot
 Yoshihime Shrine -15 minutes on foot
 Ishibe-shukuba no Sato -15 minutes on foot
 Ishibe Historical Museum -15 minutes on foot

See also
List of railway stations in Japan

References

External links

JR West official home page

Railway stations in Shiga Prefecture
Railway stations in Japan opened in 1889
Konan, Shiga